In French cuisine, fougasse (in occitan fogaça) is a type of bread typically associated with Provence but found (with variations) in other regions. Some versions are sculpted or slashed into a pattern resembling a head  of wheat.

History and etymology
In ancient Rome, panis focacius was a flatbread baked in the ashes of the hearth ( in Latin). This became a diverse range of breads that include focaccia in Italian cuisine, hogaza in Spain, fogassa in Catalonia, fugàssa in Ligurian, pogača in the Balkans, pogácsa in Hungary, fougasse in Provence (originally spelled fogatza), fouace or fouée in other French regions and on the Channel Islands. The Provence version is more likely to have additions like olives, cheese, garlic or anchovies.

There is also in Portugal the fogaça, a sweet bread. In Brazil, pão sovado is a typical big fougasse, while a recipe, typical of the states of Rio de Janeiro, Espírito Santo and surrounding regions, that is halfway between fougasse and bolillo (in these regions known as pão francês or pão-de-sal), somewhat resembling a savory small brioche, is called pão suíço. They are perhaps the sweetest of savory artisanal bread recipes commonly made in Brazil.

Fougasse was traditionally used to assess the temperature of a wood fired oven. The time it would take to bake gives an idea of the oven temperature and whether the rest of the bread can be loaded (hence the French phrase "": "do not burn the fougasse").

Fougasse is also a type of pastry from Monaco that is topped with almonds and nuts.

Use in dishes
It is used to make the French version of calzone, which can have cheese and small squarish strips of bacon inside the pocket made by folding over the bread. Other variations include dried fruit, Roquefort and nuts or olives and goat cheese. It is known by extension as a fougasse.

References

Occitan desserts
French breads
Olive dishes
Anchovy dishes